The bowler hat, also known as a billycock, bob hat, bombín (Spanish) or derby (United States), is a hard felt hat with a rounded crown, originally created by the London hat-makers Thomas and William Bowler in 1849. It has traditionally been worn with semi-formal and informal attire. The bowler, a protective and durable hat style, was popular with the British, Irish, and American working classes during the second half of the 19th century, and later with the middle and upper classes in the United Kingdom, Ireland, and the east coast of the United States.

Origins
The bowler hat was designed in 1849 by the London hat-makers Thomas and William Bowler to fulfill an order placed by the company of hatters James Lock & Co. of St James's, which had been commissioned by a customer to design a close-fitting, low-crowned hat to protect gamekeepers from low-hanging branches while on horseback at Holkham Hall, the estate of Thomas Coke, 1st Earl of Leicester in Norfolk. The keepers had previously worn top hats, which were knocked off easily and damaged.

The identity of the customer is less certain, with many suggesting it was William Coke. However, research performed by a younger relation of the 1st Earl casts doubt on this story, and it is claimed by James Lock & Co. that the bowler was invented for Edward Coke, the younger brother of Thomas Coke, 2nd Earl of Leicester. When Edward Coke arrived in London on 17 December 1849 to collect his hat he reputedly placed it on the floor and stamped hard on it twice to test its strength; the hat withstood this test and Coke paid 12 shillings for it.

Cultural significance in the British Isles 

The bowler has had varying degrees of significance in British culture. They were popular among the working classes in the 19th century. From the early 20th century bowler hats were more commonly associated with financial workers and businessmen working in the financial districts, also known as "City gents". The traditional wearing of bowler hats with City business attire declined during the 1970s. In modern times bowlers are not common, although the so-called City gent wearing a bowler and carrying a rolled umbrella remains a representation of Englishmen. For this reason, two bowler-hatted men were used in the logo of the British building society (subsequently bank), Bradford & Bingley.

In Scotland and Northern Ireland the bowler hat is worn traditionally by members of the main Loyalist fraternities such as the Orange Order, the Independent Loyal Orange Institution, the Royal Black Preceptory and the Apprentice Boys of Derry for their parades and annual celebrations.

Female officers of many British police forces also wear bowler hats as part of their uniforms. This includes a cap badge and generally has a black-and-white chequered band (called Sillitoe tartan) around the hat. Bowlers worn by traffic police officers have white crowns or covers. They are also part of the uniforms of female police community support officers (PCSOs).

Outside the British Isles 

The bowler, not the cowboy hat or sombrero, was the most popular hat in the American West, prompting Lucius Beebe to call it "the hat that won the West". Both cowboys and railroad workers preferred the hat because it would not blow off easily in strong wind while riding a horse, or when sticking one's head out the window of a speeding train. It was worn by both lawmen and outlaws, including Bat Masterson, Butch Cassidy, Black Bart, and Billy the Kid. In the United States the hat came to be known commonly as the derby, and American outlaw Marion Hedgepeth was commonly referred to as "the Derby Kid".

For many years, a factory in Italy manufactured such hats for the Bolivian market, but they are now made locally.

In Norway, Hans Majestet Kongens Garde (the royal guards) wear plumed bowler hats as part of their uniform. It was copied from the hats of the Italian Bersaglieri troops; a regiment that so impressed the Swedish princess Louise that she insisted the Norwegian guards be similarly hatted in 1860.

In the Philippines, bowler hats were known by its Spanish name . Along with the native buntal hats, they were a common part of the traditional men's ensemble of the barong tagalog during the second half of the 19th century.

The bowler hat was worn by the national hero of the Philippines, José Rizal, during his execution on December 30, 1896, and it is still seen as symbolic of the history of the  Philippine Revolution.

In popular culture 

The bowler hat was famously used by actors such as Charlie Chaplin, Laurel and Hardy, Curly Howard, and John Cleese, and by the fictional character John Steed of The Avengers, played by Patrick Macnee.

In the 1964 film Mary Poppins, set in Edwardian London, 1910, the London banker George Banks (played by David Tomlinson) wears a bowler.

The British building society Bradford & Bingley registered more than 100 separate trademarks featuring the bowler hat, its long-running logo. In 1995 the bank purchased, for £2000, a bowler hat which had once belonged to Stan Laurel.

The bowler is part of the Droog outfit that main character Alex wears in the film version of A Clockwork Orange to the extent that contemporary fancy dress costumes for this character refer to the bowler hat.

There was a chain of restaurants in Los Angeles, California known as Brown Derby. The first and most famous of these was shaped like a derby. A chain of Brown Derby restaurants in Ohio is still in business today.

Many paintings by the Belgian surrealist artist René Magritte feature bowler hats. The Son of Man consists of a man in a bowler hat standing in front of a wall. The man's face is largely obscured by a hovering green apple. Golconda depicts "raining men" all wearing bowler hats.

Choreographer Bob Fosse frequently incorporated bowler hats into his dance routines. This use of hats as props, as seen in the 1972 movie Cabaret, would become one of his trademarks.

In the 2007 Disney animated film Meet the Robinsons, the main antagonist is known as the Bowler Hat Guy.

Cornelius Fudge in the Harry Potter series is frequently mentioned as wearing a bowler hat.

Roman Torchwick, a recurring villain in the web animated series RWBY wears a bowler hat. It is later worn by his henchwoman Neopolitan after Roman's death.

The third album by British rock group Stackridge, released in 1974, is called The Man in the Bowler Hat.

In The Adventures of Rocky and Bullwinkle and Friends cartoon series, the legendary “Kerwood Derby” was worn by such world conquerors as Alexander the Great and Elvis Presley.

In the Series One episode “The Think Tank” of the program Are You Being Served?, the Grace Brothers store policy is revealed to include a hierarchical order for hats male personnel wear:  bowlers for departmental heads and above, homburgs for senior floor staff and trilbys or caps for junior floor staff.  The character of Captain Peacock is admonished for wearing a bowler when he is only entitled to a homburg.

In the mid-1960s Batman TV series, the Penguin's band of “fine feathered finks” usually wear derby hats. The only exception was in Batman: The Movie, where his men donned pirate gear to crew his penguin-themed submarine.

Notable wearers

Winston Churchill, Prime Minister during the 2nd World War.
José Rizal, a Filipino patriot and national hero, wore a bowler hat before his execution by firing squad in 1896.
The Plug Uglies, a nineteenth-century American street gang, wore bowler hats stuffed with cloth or wool to protect their heads while fighting.
John Bonham, drummer for Led Zeppelin, often wore a bowler hat.
Charlie Chaplin wore a bowler hat to his morning dress as part of his 'Little Tramp' costume.
Edward Coke, for whom the first bowler hat was designed.
Bing Crosby wears a bowler hat in the 1946 film Road to Utopia, among others. 
Alex, the protagonist of A Clockwork Orange, wears a bowler hat in the film of the  novel.
Lou Costello of Abbott and Costello often wore a bowler hat.
Laurel and Hardy are known for wearing bowler hats.
Curly Howard of The Three Stooges frequently wore a bowler hat
John Steed of The Avengers wore a variety of bowler hats throughout the series.
Boy George often wore a bowler hat during the 1980s.
Oddjob, Auric Goldfinger's manservant, uses his razor-edged bowler hat as a weapon In the 1964 James Bond movie Goldfinger.
John D. Rockerduck possesses the distinctive character trait of eating his bowler hat whenever he is defeated by Scrooge McDuck.
 Dr. Peacock, Dutch DJ, music producer, label owner, event organizer and businessman. 
 J. Wellington Wimpy wears a bowler hat.
Notable comic book characters who wear bowler hats include Timothy "Dum Dum" Dugan (Marvel Comics), Thomson and Thompson and Professor Calculus from The Adventures of Tintin series, and the Riddler (DC Comics).
Matthew "Stymie" Beard from the Little Rascals was always seen with a bowler hat. It was a gift from Stan Laurel. 
In the Tom and Jerry episode "Jerry’s Cousin" (1951) Jerry's cousin Muscles wears a bowler hat.
Big Bully Busick professional wrestler who wore a bowler hat as part of his 1920s bully gimmick.
Tom Baker wore a black bowler hat when playing the Fourth Doctor on the Doctor Who episode "Horror of Fang Rock" and Matt Smith also wore a bowler hat when playing the Eleventh Doctor on the episode "The Crimson Horror".
Hipólito Yrigoyen, President of Argentina, frequently wore a bombín hat

References

Further reading
 Fred Miller Robinson, The Man in the Bowler Hat: His History and Iconography (Chapel Hill and London: The University of North Carolina Press, 1993).
 "Whatever Became of the Derby Hat?" Lucius Beebe, Gourmet, May 1966.

External links 

1849 introductions
19th-century fashion
20th-century fashion
British clothing
Hats
History of clothing (Western fashion)
History of fashion
Rider apparel
21st-century fashion
Victorian fashion
Semi-formal wear